Synanthedon culiciformis, known as the large red-belted clearwing, is a moth of the family Sesiidae. It is found in the Palearctic and Nearctic realms.

The moth flies from April to August depending on the location.

The larvae feed on various deciduous trees, especially birch but also alder.

References

External links

Vlindernet
Lepidoptera of Belgium 
Large red-belted clearwing at UKmoths

Sesiidae
Moths described in 1758
Taxa named by Carl Linnaeus
Moths of Europe